The Milk of Human Kindness is the third studio album by Canadian musician Dan Snaith, released under the moniker Caribou on April 18, 2005, by The Leaf Label and Domino Recording Company. It is Snaith's first album credited under Caribou, with Snaith having dropped his previous moniker Manitoba following the release of Up in Flames in 2003 due to a threatened lawsuit by Handsome Dick Manitoba of The Dictators.

While the title is a quote from William Shakespeare's play Macbeth, Snaith has been quoted as saying that he read it off the back of a milk truck. The album received critical acclaim.

In 2009, Seattle emcee producer Ryan Lewis sampled the song "Subotnik" for "Vipassana," the first track on their critically acclaimed project, The VS. EP.

Track listing 

Sample credits
 "Subotnick" contains samples of "Love on a Two-Way Street", written by Bert Keyes and Sylvia Robinson and performed by The Moments.

Charts

References

External links 
 The Milk of Human Kindness at official Caribou website
 

2005 albums
Dan Snaith albums
Domino Recording Company albums
The Leaf Label albums
Folktronica albums